Each "article" in this category is a collection of entries about several stamp issuers, presented in alphabetical order. The entries are formulated on the micro model and so provide summary information about all known issuers.  

See the :Category:Compendium of postage stamp issuers page for details of the project.

Wadhwan 

Dates 	1888 – 1892
Currency 	4 pice = 1 anna

Refer 	Indian Native States

Wake Island 

Currency 	100 cents = 1 dollar (US)

Refer 	United States of America (USA)

Wales 

Dates 	1958 –
Capital 	Cardiff
Currency 	(1958) 12 pence = 1 shilling; 20 shillings = 1 pound
		(1971) 100 pence = 1 pound

Refer 	Great Britain (Regional Issues)

Wallachia 

Refer 	Moldo–Wallachia

Wallis & Futuna Islands 

Dates 	1920 –
Capital 	Matauta
Currency 	100 centimes = 1 franc

Main Article Postage stamps and postal history of Wallis and Futuna

Walvis Bay 

Refer 	South West Africa

Wenden 

Dates 	1863 – 1901
Currency 	100 kopecks = 1 Russian ruble

Main Article Needed

West Berlin 

Dates 	1948 – 1991
Currency 	100 pfennige = 1 mark

Main Article Deutsche Bundespost Berlin

West Germany 

Dates 	1949 – 1991
Capital 	Bonn
Currency 	100 pfennige = 1 mark

Main Article Deutsche Bundespost

West Irian 

Dates 	1963 – 1970
Capital 	Hollandia
Currency 	100 sen = 1 rupiah

Main Article Needed 

Includes 	Western New Guinea

See also 	Indonesia;
		Netherlands Indies

Western New Guinea 

Dates 	1962 – 1963
Capital 	Hollandia
Currency 	100 cents = 1 gulden

Refer 	West Irian

West Ukraine 

Dates 	1918 – 1919
Capital 	Lemberg (Lviv)
Currency 	100 heller = 1 krone

Main Article Needed

Western Army 

Dates 	1919 – 1920
Currency 	100 kopecks = 1 Russian ruble

Refer 	Russian Civil War Issues

Western Australia 

Dates 	1854 – 1912
Capital 	Perth
Currency 	12 pence = 1 shilling; 20 shillings = 1 pound

Main Article Needed 

See also 	Australia

Western Command Area 

Dates 	1916 – 1918
Currency 	100 centimes = 1 franc

Refer 	German Occupation Issues (World War I)

Western Samoa 

Dates 	1935 – 1958
Capital 	Apia
Currency 	12 pence = 1 shilling; 20 shillings = 1 pound

Refer 	Samoa

Western Thrace 

Dates 	1913 only
Capital  	Dedêagatz (now Alexandroupoli)
Currency  	40 paras = 1 piastre

Refer 	Thrace

See also 	Dedêagatz (Greek Occupation);
		Eastern Thrace;
		Greek Occupation Issues;
		Gumultsina;
		Thrace (Allied Occupation);
		Western Thrace (Greek Occupation)

Western Thrace (Greek Occupation) 

Dates 	1920 only
Capital  	Dedêagatz (now Alexandroupoli)
Currency  	100 lepta = 1 drachma

Refer 	Thrace

See also 	Dedêagatz (Greek Occupation);
		Greek Occupation Issues;
		Gumultsina;
		Thrace (Allied Occupation);
		Western Thrace

White Russia 

Refer 	Belarus

Windward Islands 

Capital 	St George's, Grenada

Refer 	Grenada;
		St Lucia;
		St Vincent

Wolmaransstad 

Dates 	1900 only
Currency 	12 pence = 1 shilling; 20 shillings = 1 pound

Refer 	Transvaal

World Health Organization 

Dates 	1948 – 1975
Currency 	100 centimes = 1 franc

Refer 	International Organisations

World Intellectual Property Organisation 

Dates 	1982 only
Currency 	100 centimes = 1 franc

Refer 	International Organisations

World Meteorological Organisation 

Dates 	1956 – 1973
Currency 	100 centimes = 1 franc

Refer 	International Organisations

Wrangel Government 

Dates 	1920 – 1921
Capital 	Sevastopol
Currency 	100 kopecks = 1 Russian ruble

Refer 	Russian Civil War Issues

Württemberg 

Dates 	1851 – 1924
Capital 	Stuttgart
Currency 	(1851) 60 kreuzer = 1 gulden
		(1875) 100 pfennige = 1 mark

Main Article Needed

Württemberg (French Zone) 

Dates 	1947 – 1949
Capital 	Stuttgart
Currency 	100 pfennige = 1 mark

Refer 	Germany (Allied Occupation)

References

Bibliography
 Stanley Gibbons Ltd, Europe and Colonies 1970, Stanley Gibbons Ltd, 1969
 Stanley Gibbons Ltd, various catalogues
 Stuart Rossiter & John Flower, The Stamp Atlas, W H Smith, 1989
 XLCR Stamp Finder and Collector's Dictionary, Thomas Cliffe Ltd, c.1960

External links
 AskPhil – Glossary of Stamp Collecting Terms
 Encyclopaedia of Postal History

Wad